The Women's Korean Basketball League (WKBL) (Hangul: 한국여자프로농구) is the premier professional women's basketball league in South Korea. The league was established in 1998.

Current clubs

See also 
 Korean Basketball League

External links 
 Official website 
 WKBL at Asia-Basket.com

 
Women's basketball in South Korea
Women's basketball leagues in Asia
Sports leagues established in 1998
1998 establishments in South Korea
Professional sports leagues in South Korea